Lynnwood High School is a high school in the Edmonds School District, located in Bothell, Washington. The school has approximately 1600 students enrolled for grades 9–12 as of the 2013-2014 school year. Lynnwood High School's mascot is a Chimera and athletic teams are known as Royals.

Facilities 
The school buildings are located on North Road, east of Lynnwood. The funding for construction was approved in 2006 and construction began in June 2007, after a wooded area was logged.

Designed by Bassetti Architects, the building was opened on September 8, 2009. It is configured around a central common space called The Agora, named after the Greek word for "place of assembly" and "marketplace". Four wings radiate from the Agora:  two are two-story classroom wings, each organized into small learning communities which can also be used as academies or separate small schools; the others are a performing arts wing and an athletics wing. The gymnasium and performing arts wings are designed to function separately from the rest of the building outside of normal school hours.

Green features 
Despite protests from some environmental groups, the school was built on a wooded area.  West of the new football field are the remaining evergreen trees in a protected wetland.  A natural area to the north of the school is protected wetland with a pond and trees.  A storm water detention pond north of the football field diverts potentially polluted water from going into local creeks and waterways. Classrooms are not air conditioned but have natural convection ventilation.  The buildings have received an Energy Star design certification.  Its expected energy use is a reduction of 44 percent compared with an average building of similar type.

Design awards 
The new building received the international annual design award of the Council of Educational Facilities Planners International for 2010, the James D. MacConnell Award for outstanding new educational facilities.
In 2011 the new school was recognized as one of ten "Schools of the 21st Century – The Latest Thinking and Best Ideas on the Planning and Design of K-12 School Buildings", by Architectural Record magazine.

Former location 

The former Lynnwood High School, located at 3001 184th St SW, was vacant from 2009 to 2015. Demolition of the old high school began on August 3, 2010.

The site is planned to be redeveloped into a multi-use center called Lynnwood Place with retail and restaurant components.  In December 2010 it was announced that Costco Wholesale would occupy  of the property. Construction started on the Costco in July 2014 and opened on October 1st 2015.

Athletics
Lynnwood has a variety of different sports teams, playing in the Wesco Conference South 3A division. Lynnwood's traditional rival in athletics is Mountlake Terrace High School, although they do have crosstown rivalries with division rivals Meadowdale High School and Edmonds Woodway High School.

Football
The Lynnwood football team had a historic losing streak in the state of Washington. In 2016 the team made their first state playoff appearance since 1995 when they defeated Garfield High School (Seattle) in a shootout 63-45 before losing in the next round.

Girls Basketball
Lynnwood girls basketball has reached the state tournament multiple times since the 2012-13 season. In the 2014-15 season, the basketball team claimed their first ever state title when they beat Cleveland High School by a score of 54–42 in the Tacoma Dome.

State championships
Girls basketball: 2014
Track and field: 1991, 1994, 2016

Notable alumni
Randy Couture -  retired professional mixed martial artist, former UFC Light Heavyweight and Heavyweight Champion
Mikayla Pivec - professional basketball player WNBA
Ijeoma Oluo - Writer, Social Critic
Orlondo Steinauer - retired CFL player
Brett Mitchell - Conductor and music director of the Colorado Symphony
Katie Thurston - Contestant on Season 25 of The Bachelor, Lead of Season 17 of The Bachelorette
Jennifer Goeckel - Paralympian, wheelchair athlete, U.S. Paralympic Track & Field 2008, 2004

See also 
 Edmonds School District

References

External links 
Lynnwood High School official website
Edmonds School District official website

High schools in Snohomish County, Washington
Lynnwood, Washington
Public high schools in Washington (state)
Educational institutions established in 1970
1970 establishments in Washington (state)